Alex Turrin (born 3 June 1992 in Feltre) is an Italian former professional cyclist, who rode professionally between 2016 and 2018 for the  and  teams. In May 2018, he was named in the startlist for the Giro d'Italia.

Major results

2010
 7th Overall Giro della Lunigiana
2012
 5th Giro del Belvedere
2013
 3rd Giro del Medio Brenta
2015
 2nd Gran Premio Città di Vigonza
 5th Gran Premio Industrie del Marmo
2016
 2nd Overall Tour de Serbie
 3rd Overall Sibiu Cycling Tour
 6th Overall Tour du Maroc
1st Stage 7
 6th Gran Premio Industrie del Marmo
2018
 9th Overall Tour de Taiwan
 9th Giro dell'Appennino
 10th GP Izola

Grand Tour general classification results timeline

References

External links
 

1992 births
Living people
Italian male cyclists
People from Feltre
Cyclists from the Province of Belluno